Let's Stick Together is a 1976 album by Bryan Ferry. His third solo release, it was his first following the disbanding of Roxy Music earlier in the year. Unlike Ferry's two previous solo recordings, Let’s Stick Together was not a dedicated album project, instead being made up of material released as singles, B-sides and an EP. It had a generally favourable critical reception, but only just made the UK Top 20.

Production
Five of the tracks on the album were remakes of Bryan Ferry songs previously recorded with Roxy Music. "Re-Make/Re-Model", "2HB", "Chance Meeting" and "Sea Breezes" were from the band's self-titled debut album (1972), while "Casanova" was taken from Country Life (1974). In most cases the re-recordings were smoother and more oriented to jazz and R&B than the original Roxy Music versions.

The other six tracks on the album were covers. The sax-driven "Let's Stick Together" was written and originally recorded by Wilbert Harrison. It was remixed in 1988 for the compilation The Ultimate Collection. Other up-tempo numbers were The Everly Brothers' "The Price of Love" and Jimmy Reed's "Shame, Shame, Shame" (which includes a counter-vocal by the backing singers which quotes Marvin Gaye's "Can I Get A Witness"). The remaining covers, which included The Beatles' "It's Only Love", were performed in a mellow cabaret style.

"2HB" (a tribute to Humphrey Bogart) had been released as the B-side of Ferry's single "A Hard Rain's a-Gonna Fall" in September 1973. "Chance Meeting" was the B-side of "The 'In' Crowd" in May 1974. "You Go to My Head" b/w "Re-Make/Re-Model" had been released as a single in June 1975, making #33 in the UK charts. "Let’s Stick Together" b/w "Sea Breezes" was released in June 1976, making #4. The Extended Play EP, featuring "The Price of Love" and "Shame, Shame, Shame" b/w "Heart on My Sleeve" and "It’s Only Love", was released in August 1976, making #7. "Casanova" - a version of which appeared on Roxy Music's 1974 album "Country Life"  - was recorded in the "Another Time, Another Place" sessions in 1974 and eventually issued as the B-side of Ferry's cover of The Velvet Underground's "What Goes On" in May 1978. The song "Let's Stick Together" was re-released in 1988 as "Let's Stick Together '88", making #12.

Various Roxy Music members were involved in the recordings, including Paul Thompson on drums, Eddie Jobson on violin and synthesizer, John Gustafson and John Porter on bass, and Phil Manzanera and David O'List on guitar. Jerry Hall made an appearance in tiger skin costume, complete with tail, on the title track's video clip, and did the song's yelps in the chorus.

Critical reception

Reviewing for AllMusic, Ned Raggett wrote of the album: "As Roxy approached its mid- to late-'70s hibernation, Ferry came up with another fine solo album, though one of his most curious." According to Robert Christgau, "A lot of people are crazy about this record, but I find its bifurcation alienating." He added: "Although Ferry proves that he knows more about making records (and music) than he used to, the songs remain powerful, strange, and interesting—but not quite compelling. Add it all together and you get ... two separate parts."

Track listing

Personnel 
 Bryan Ferry – vocals, keyboards, harmonica
 Eddie Jobson – synthesizers, violin
 Chris Spedding – guitars
 Neil Hubbard – lead guitar (2)
 David O'List – lead guitar (7)
 Phil Manzanera – lead guitar (10)
 John Wetton – bass (1, 2, 4, 6-9, 11)
 Rick Wills – bass (3)
 John Porter – bass (5)
 John Gustafson – bass (10)
 Paul Thompson – drums
 Morris Pert – percussion
 Mel Collins – soprano saxophone
 Chris Mercer – tenor saxophone
 Martin Drover – trumpet
 Ann Odell – string arrangements (4)
 Vicki Brown – chorus 
 Doreen Chanter – chorus
 Helen Chappelle – chorus
 Paddie McHugh – chorus 
 Jackie Sullivan – chorus 
 Martha Walker – chorus

Production 
 Bryan Ferry – producer 
 Chris Thomas – producer 
 Steve Nye – engineer
 John Punter – engineer
 Nigel Walker – assistant engineer
 Jon Walls – assistant engineer
 Richard Wallis – photography

Charts

Weekly charts

Year-end charts

References

Sources
 David Buckley (2004). The Thrill of It All: The Story of Bryan Ferry and Roxy Music

External links
 Roxyrama Chronology
 Viva Roxy Music

1976 albums
Bryan Ferry albums
Covers albums
Albums produced by Chris Thomas (record producer)
Albums recorded at AIR Studios